
Gmina Mycielin

Villages
Gmina Mycielin contains the villages and settlements of Aleksandrów, Annówka, Bogusławice, Bugaj, Danowiec, Dzierzbin, Dzierzbin-Kolonia, Elżbietów, Gadów, Grabek, Jaszczury, Kazala Nowa, Kazala Stara, Klotyldów, Korzeniew, Kościelec, Kościelec-Kolonia, Kukułka, Kuszyn, Mycielin, Nowiny, Przyranie, Słuszków, Stropieszyn, Teodorów and Zamęty.

Neighbouring gminas
Gmina Mycielin is bordered by the gminas of Ceków-Kolonia, Malanów, Rychwał, Stawiszyn, Tuliszków and Żelazków.

References
Polish official population figures 2006

Mycielin
Kalisz County